Eduardo Rey Muñoz (born 7 August 1957) is a Peruvian footballer. He played in 25 matches for the Peru national football team from 1980 to 1989. He was also part of Peru's squad for the 1983 Copa América tournament.

References

External links
 

1957 births
Living people
Peruvian footballers
Peru international footballers
Place of birth missing (living people)
Association football forwards